The 70th Bodil Awards were held on 4 March 2017 in Denmark, honoring the best national and foreign films of 2016. In the Blood won 3 awards, including the Bodil Award for Best Danish Film.

It was hosted by Mille Lehfeldt, Laus Høybye, and Jakob Fauerby.

Winners

References

External links
 

2016 in Denmark
Bodil Awards ceremonies
March 2017 events in Europe